This is a list of people from Yorkshire. Yorkshire is the largest historic county in both England and the United Kingdom. Some of the most notable figures from the county are:

Lawyers and Jurists

Brenda Hale, President of the British Supreme Court, 2017–present

Inventors, explorers, scientists and pioneers

Politicians and activists

Writers

Saints

Entertainers

Actors and actresses

Television performers

Musicians and bands

Sport

Artists and sculptors

Crime

People in fiction
Dracula by Bram Stoker: A Russian ship, the Demeter, having weighed anchor at Varna, runs aground on the shores of Whitby, North Yorkshire, England, during a fierce tempest. Whitby continues to celebrate its link with Dracula, as well as its Victorian gothic past
Beedle the Bard: In J. K. Rowling's Harry Potter wizarding world, he is the fictional author of The Tales of Beedle the Bard. Beedle was born in Yorkshire in the 15th century.
Robinson Crusoe: The title character from the novel by Daniel Defoe is from York
 Robin Ellacott, Cormoran Strike's detective partner in the Cormoran Strike series by Robert Galbraith, was raised in Masham, North Yorkshire

Others
Thomas Wedders, circus sideshow performer.

See also
List of people from Kingston upon Hull
List of people from Leeds
List of people from Sheffield
List of people from the East Riding of Yorkshire
List of people from North Yorkshire
List of people from South Yorkshire
List of people from West Yorkshire
List of Yorkshire County Cricket Club players
Historic names
Whincup, the earliest references are in the 16th century in Yorkshire (Spofforth, Collingham, Copgrove)

References

External links
Yorkshire-Icons.com – covering the most notable Yorkshire people

 
Yorkshire
People